Choi Seok-bae (Hangul: 최석배, born February 28, 1992), better known by his stage name Nafla (Hangul: 나플라), is a South Korean rapper. He was the winner of Show Me the Money 777.

Discography

Studio albums

Extended plays

Charted singles

References

1992 births
Living people
South Korean male rappers
South Korean hip hop singers
21st-century South Korean male singers
Show Me the Money (South Korean TV series) contestants